Academic Medicine is a monthly peer-reviewed medical journal published by the Association of American Medical Colleges. It covers various aspects of medicine in an academic settings like education and training issues; health and science policy; institutional policy, management, and values; research practice; and clinical practice.

History
The journal was established in 1926 as the Bulletin of the Association of American Medical Colleges. It was renamed Journal of the Association of American Medical Colleges in 1929. In 1951 it briefly became Medical Education then Journal of Medical Education. In 1989 it obtained its current name. In 2015, the journal was ranked one of the top five medical education journals that received attention in social media sources, such as Twitter and Facebook.

In the course of its history, the journal has had ten editors. Laura Weiss Roberts is the present editor-in-chief, appointed in 2019.

Abstracting and indexing
The journal is abstracted and indexed in:
Index Medicus/MEDLINE/PubMed
Science Citation Index Expanded

References

External links

Monthly journals
English-language journals
General medical journals
Academic journals published by learned and professional societies of the United States
Publications established in 1926